Wendake may refer to:

 Huronia (region), the historical homeland of the Huron/Wendat/Wyandot nation in Ontario
 Wendake, Quebec, a Huron reserve near Quebec City in Quebec, populated by Huron who returned to Quebec following the Huron-Iroquois wars
 Wendake Beach, Ontario, a community on Nottawasaga Bay in Ontario, within the historical Wendake lands